2008–09 Albanian Cup was the fifty-seventh season of Albania's annual cup competition. It began on September 24, 2008 with the First Preliminary Round and ended on May 6, 2009 with the Final. The winners of the competition qualified for the second qualifying round of the UEFA Europa League. Vllaznia were the defending champions.

The rounds were played in a two-legged format similar to those of European competitions. If the aggregated score was tied after both games, the team with the higher number of away goals advanced. If the number of away goals was equal in both games, the match was decided by extra time and a penalty shootout, if necessary.

Preliminary Tournament
In order to reduce the number of participating teams for the First Round to 32, a preliminary tournament was played. Only teams from the Kategoria e Dytë (III) were allowed to enter. Each Kategoria e Dytë group played its own tournament. In contrast to the main tournament, the preliminary tournament was held as a single-leg knock-out competition.

First Preliminary Round
Games were played on September 24, 2008.

|colspan="3" style="background-color:#B00000; color:#FFFFFF;"|Northern Group

|-
|colspan="3" style="background-color:#B00000; color:#FFFFFF;"|Southern Group

|}

Second Preliminary Round
Games were played on October 2, 2008.

|colspan="3" style="background-color:#B00000; color:#FFFFFF;"|Northern Group

|-
|colspan="3" style="background-color:#B00000; color:#FFFFFF;"|Southern Group

|}

First round
All twenty-eight teams of the 2008–09 Kategoria Superiore and Kategoria e Parë entered in this round. First legs were played on October 29, 2008 and the second legs were played on November 12, 2008.

|}

Second round
In this round entered winners from the previous round. First legs were played on December 3, 2008 and the second legs were played on December 17, 2008.

|}

Quarter-finals
First legs were played on February 25, 2009 and the second legs were played on March 11, 2009.

|}
1Dinamo Tirana were excluded from the Cup because they fielded Elis Bakaj although he previously played in the Cup for Partizani. Second leg's 0–0 score was annulled and Vllaznia were awarded a 2–0 win.

Two-legged results of Flamurtari–Partizani match (1–0; 0–1 aet, p. 4–5) were cancelled due to both teams fielding players that previously played in the Cup for other teams. Flamurtari's Eriol Merxha played for Elbasani while Partizani's Genti Gjondedaj and Engert Bakalli played for Teuta and Elbasani, respectively. The match was one-legged, played on Stadiumi Niko Dovana, Durrës on April 8, 2009.

|}

Semi-finals
First legs were played on April 15, 2009 and the second legs were played on April 29, 2009.

|}

Final

External links
 Official website 
 Albanian Cup on rsssf.org

References

Cup, 2008-09
Albanian Cup, 2008-09
Albanian Cup seasons